Mro-Khimi (also Mro, Mro Wakim, or Mro Chin) is a Kuki-Chin language of Burma spoken by the Mro-Khimi people.

Geographical distribution
Mro-Khimi is spoken in the following townships of Myanmar (Ethnologue).

Chin State: Paletwa township
Rakhine State: Kyauktaw, Buthidaung, Ponnagyun, Pauktaw, Mrauk U, and Maungdaw townships.

Dialects
There are 4 main dialects of Mro-Khimi (Ethnologue).

Arang (Ahraing Khami, Areung, Aroeng)
Xengna (Hrengna)
Xata
Vakung (Wakun, Wakung)

Wakun (Vakung) is the most widely spoken and understood dialect (Horney 2009:5). Horney (2009:5) also lists Aryn, Dau, Khuitupui, Likhy, Pamnau, Tuiron, Xautau, and Xienau as dialects of khami. Horney (2009) describes phonologies of the Wakun and Xautau dialects.

References

Kuki-Chin languages